Brian Weber (born November 12, 1966) is an American professional stock car racing driver. He competes part-time in the NASCAR Xfinity Series, driving the No. 66 Ford Mustang for MBM Motorsports.

Racing career
Weber made his debut in the then NASCAR Busch Grand National Series in 1988, driving his self-owned No. 04 Buick at Indianapolis Raceway Park, where he would finish 31st with an engine issue.

Weber would not return to the series until 2001, when he once again drove for his own team, this time for Jay Robinson Racing at Watkins Glen International, where he would finish 39th after not starting due to an engine issue. For the following year, Weber would field his own team, driving the No. 84 and 8 Chevrolets, in select events, starting with Bristol Motor Speedway, where he would finish 25th, twelve laps down. He would replicate this finish at Nazareth Speedway later in the year. He would return in 2003, although he only made five starts, with a best finish of 25th at Gateway International Raceway.

After not competing in NASCAR for the next six years, Weber would make his NASCAR Camping World Truck Series debut at New Hampshire Motor Speedway, driving the No. 00 Chevrolet for Daisy Ramirez, where he would finish 34th due to an overheating issue. He would make another start for Ramirez at Phoenix International Raceway, this time in the No. 01 truck, where he would finish eight laps down in 25th. Weber would return in 2012, driving for Mike Harmon Racing in the No. 74 Chevrolet for two events, failing to qualify at Rockingham Speedway, and finishing 26th at Phoenix due to a rear gear failure.

After not competing in NASCAR between 2013 and 2022, Weber announced on March 6, 2023, that he would return to the now NASCAR Xfinity Series, driving the No. 66 Ford for MBM Motorsports at that weekend's event at Phoenix. He was replaced during practice by Timmy Hill, and ultimately failed to make the race. He has indicated that 2023 would be his final year of racing competition.

Motorsports results

NASCAR
(key) (Bold – Pole position awarded by qualifying time. Italics – Pole position earned by points standings or practice time. * – Most laps led.)

Xfinity Series

Camping World Truck Series

ARCA Re/Max Series
(key) (Bold – Pole position awarded by qualifying time. Italics – Pole position earned by points standings or practice time. * – Most laps led.)

References

External links
 

1966 births
Living people
NASCAR drivers
Racing drivers from New York (state)
People from Long Island